The Corn Years is an album by Death in June, released in 1989.

The first Death in June material to be (officially) released in CD format, this album compiles and reinterprets output from 1985 through 1987.  Personnel involved on the compilation include Douglas P., David Tibet, Rose McDowall, Andrea James, Gary Carey, Bee, John Balance, Jan O', David Tiffen, and J.R.P.

Track listing
 "Heilige!"  (new introduction)
 "Torture by Roses"  (from The World That Summer)
 "Love Murder" (re-recorded version, originally from The World That Summer)
 "Zimmerit" (from "To Drown A Rose" single)
 "We are the Lust" (from Brown Book)
 "To Drown A Rose" (from Brown Book)
 "Break the Black Ice" (re-recorded version, originally from The World That Summer)
 "Behind the Rose (Fields of Rape)" (re-recorded version, originally from Nada!)
 "Punishment Initiation" (from Brown Book)
 "Rocking Horse Night" (from The World That Summer)
 "Break the Black Ice (Instrumental)" (from The World That Summer)
 "Runes and Men" (from Brown Book)
 "Rule Again" (re-recorded version, originally from The World That Summer)
 "Hail! The White Grain" (from Brown Book)
 "Blood of Winter" (from The World That Summer)
 "The Fog of the World" (from Brown Book)
 "Europa: The Gates of Heaven" (from "To Drown a Rose" single)
 "Come Before Christ and Murder Love" (from The World That Summer)

Death in June albums
1989 compilation albums